Kalfu (literally crossroads) is one of the petro aspects of Papa Legba, a lwa in Haitian Vodou. He is often envisioned as a young man or as a demon; his color is red and he favors rum infused with gunpowder. He is often syncretized with Satan.

As his name indicates, he also controls the crossroads and has the power to grant or deny access to all other lwa, or spirits, and he allows the "crossing" of bad luck, deliberate destruction, misfortune, and injustices.

Footnotes

Notes

References 

Crossroads mythology
Fortune gods
Liminal deities
Magic gods
Haitian Vodou gods
Lunar gods